Cigarette Beach is the second in the Trilogy of Terror, a series of three EPs by Pittsburgh alternative hip hop duo Grand Buffet. Although no singles were released, three songs later appeared on the compilation album Five Years Of Fireworks: "Oh My God You're Weird!", "Matt And Nate", and "Murderfuck". This album is one Grand Buffet's most popular releases.

Track listing

Notes
"Thus Ends The Beach" is a relatively short outro followed by several minutes of silence and a short untitled hidden track. Counting the silent break, it is the longest track on the album. It is the last track of Cigarette Beach, which mainly consists of the band members talking casually about the album.
Grand Buffet have stated that the word "Batman" is hidden on the album by backmasking.

References

2002 EPs
Grand Buffet albums